Pinguicula pumila, commonly known as the small butterwort or dwarf butterwort is a small species of carnivorous plant in the genus Pinguicula. It is native to the southeastern United States, where it grows in habitats where soil is poor in nutrition.

Description
The plant grows as a small rosette of leaves, which rarely get larger than 3/4 of an inch (20mm) across. The leaves have inward curling margins, and the upper surface is covered in numerous tiny hairs with glands at their tip which secrete small drops of mucilage. The plant produces single white to pale violet flowers on the ends of stalks about 6-8 inches (150–200 mm) high. Like all butterworts, the flowers are zygomorphic, and have a spur extending from the back of the flower.

Carnivory
Insects can become trapped in the numerous sticky glads that cover the leaves, and the plant will secrete enzymes to digest them. Over time, the plant assimilates organic nitrogen and other nutrients from the decaying insect into its own tissues.

Habitat
The plant can be found growing in moist, sandy soil in pinelands and savannas, from the southeastern US, into the great plains to Oklahoma.

References

Carnivorous plants of North America
primuliflora
Endemic flora of the United States
Flora of the Southeastern United States
Flora without expected TNC conservation status